Tom Demmer (born 1986) is an American politician 

Demmer was a Republican member of the Illinois House of Representatives representing the 90th district from 2013 to 2023. The 90th district, located in northwestern Illinois included parts of Lee County, Ogle County, LaSalle County, and DeKalb County, including all or part of Dixon, Rochelle, Oregon, Byron, Polo, Stillman Valley, Davis Junction, DeKalb, Sandwich, Shabbona, Somonauk, Waterman, Leland, Earlville, and Mendota.

Education and career
Demmer was born and raised in Dixon, Illinois, where he continues to live with his wife. He attended St. Anne School, Newman Central Catholic High School, and the University of Dayton, where he earned a Bachelor of Arts degree in communications with a minor in political science.

He was a White House intern in the Office of the Vice President Dick Cheney in 2006. For a time, Demmer was Director of Innovation & Strategy at KSB Hospital. In 2009, he was elected a member of the Lee County Board. In 2023, it was announced that he would serve as the Executive Director of the Lee County Industrial Development Association. The Lee County Industrial Development Association is a not-for-profit organization whose mission is to promote, develop, and facilitate industrial, commercial, and business enterprises in Lee County

Illinois House of Representatives 
Demmer serves as Deputy Republican Leader, a role he was first appointed to in July 2018. Previously, Demmer was Republican Conference Chairman from January 2017 to July 2018. He also is a member of the Joint Committee on Administrative Rules.

In the 102nd General Assembly (2021-2022), Demmer was assigned to the following committees: Appropriations-Human Services (Republican Spokesperson); Cybersecurity, Data Analytics, & IT; Ethics & Elections; Human Services; Prescription Drug Affordability (Republican Spokesperson); and Rules. Demmer was the Republican Spokesperson on the Special Investigating Committee II in 2020 to investigate the conduct of Michael Madigan, then-Speaker of the Illinois House of Representatives.

Demmer served as an Illinois co-chair for the John Kasich's 2016 presidential campaign.

In the 2022 general election, Demmer ran for Illinois Treasurer. Demmer lost the election to incumbent Mike Frerichs. Due to the 2021 redistricting, Lee County was moved from the 90th district to the 74th district. He was succeeded as the representative for his home county by Bradley Fritts, while John Cabello won the election in the new 90th district.

Electoral history

References

External links
Representative Tom Demmer (R) 90th District at the Illinois General Assembly
State Representative Tom Demmer constituency site
Team Demmer for State Representative
 

1986 births
21st-century American politicians
County board members in Illinois
Living people
Republican Party members of the Illinois House of Representatives
People from Dixon, Illinois
University of Dayton alumni